Songbird is the debut studio album from New Zealand classical crossover artist Tayla Alexander. Songbird was released in New Zealand in November 2012 and is available in both CD and digital download formats. Songbird saw Alexander become the youngest artist to appear on the New Zealand music charts.

Track listing
Dark Waltz
Jerusalem
Amazing Grace
Songbird
Over the Rainbow
Danny Boy
O Holy Night
When A Child is Born
Ave Maria
Let It Be
Pie Jesu
Hine e Hine
Danny Boy (a cappella)

References 

2012 debut albums
2012 classical albums
Tayla Alexander albums